Martin Koch (23 December 1882 - 22 June 1940) was a Swedish novelist.

He was a key representative of the proletarian authors in Sweden.

Works 

 Ellen (1911)
 Arbetare (1912)
 Timmerdalen (1913)
 I Guds vackra värld (1916)
 Inte precis om kvinnorna (1918)
 Mauritz (1940)

1882 births
1940 deaths
Swedish male novelists
20th-century Swedish novelists
20th-century Swedish male writers